Grozavu is a Romanian surname. Notable people with the surname include:

Leontin Grozavu (born 1967), Romanian footballer and manager
Nistor Grozavu (born 1959), Moldovan politician

See also
Grozav

Romanian-language surnames